This is an incomplete list of Bavarian Envoys and Ministers to Austria from 1693 to 1920.

History

Diplomatic relations between the Electorate of Bavaria and Austria were established in 1693. In 1805, after the Peace of Pressburg, the then-elector, Maximilian Joseph, raised himself as King of Bavaria, and the Holy Roman Empire was abolished the year after. The Kingdom of Bavaria succeeded the former Electorate in 1805 and continued to exist until 1918. With the unification of Germany into the German Empire in 1871, the kingdom became a federated state of the new empire and was second in size, power, and wealth only to the leading state, the Kingdom of Prussia. In 1918, Bavaria became a republic after the German Revolution, and the kingdom was thus succeeded by the current Free State of Bavaria, and the legation was terminated.

The final Bavarian Embassy was located at the Palais Mollard-Clary, a Baroque palace in Vienna in the first district Innere Stadt, at Herrengasse 9.

Mission chiefs

Envoys from the Electorate of Bavaria 

 (1693–1736):  
 (1736–1742): Johann Franz von Haslang
 (1742–1748):  
 ...
 (–1792):  
 ...
 (1797–1800):  
 (1800–):

Envoys of the Kingdom of Bavaria 

 (1806–1815):  
 (1817–1826): 
 (1826–1827): vacant
 (1827–1832):  
 (1833–1835): August Baron de Cetto
 (1835–1842):  
 (1843–1847): Franz Oliver von Jenison-Walworth
 (1847–1849):  
 (1849–1859): 
 (1860–1870): Otto von Bray-Steinburg
 (1870–1871): Karl von Schrenck von Notzing
 (1871–1896): Otto von Bray-Steinburg 
 (1896–1902): Clemens von Podewils-Dürniz
 (1903–1919): 
 (1919–1920): Philipp von Hoffmann (liquidating chargé d'affaires)

See also
Austria–Germany relations

References

Politics of Bavaria
Diplomats of Bavaria
Ambassadors of Germany to Austria